Housing inequality is a disparity in the quality of housing in a society which is a form of economic inequality. The right to housing is recognized by many national constitutions, and the lack of adequate housing can have adverse consequences for an individual or a family. The term may apply regionally (across a geographic area), temporally (between one generation and the next) or culturally (between groups with different racial or social backgrounds). Housing inequality is directly related to racial, social, income and wealth inequality. It is often the result of market forces, discrimination and segregation.

It is also a cause and an effect of poverty. Residential inequality is especially relevant when considering Amartya Sen’s definition of poverty as "the deprivation of core capabilities".

Economic inequality
Disparities in housing explain variations in the conversion of income into human capabilities in different social climates. Income does not always translate into desirable outcomes such as healthcare, education, and housing quality is a factor which determines if those outcomes are readily available to an individual. According to economist and philosopher Amartya Sen, an individual's freedoms (or capabilities) are significant indicators of the kind of life they value or have a reason to value. As economic equality varies by economic system, historical period and society, so does housing inequality.

Economic inequality is a primary contributing factor to housing inequality. The distribution of wealth in a region affects who has access to housing, and at what level.

Causes
Sociologist John Milton Yinger describes urban residential inequality as a result of housing-market forces. Yinger reasons that, all else being equal, housing becomes relatively more expensive as it is closer to work sites. Because poorer families often cannot afford to pay transportation costs, they may be forced to live in inner-city locations closer to employment opportunities. To win the spatial competition for housing near work sites, lower-income families must compensate for a high-priced location by accepting smaller housing, lower-quality housing or both.  These market forces are subject to other socio-economic factors; no one cause can explain housing inequality. In the United States, Thomas Shapiro and Jessica Kenty-Drane point to the wealth gaps between African Americans and other groups as likely causes of the housing disparity between African Americans and the rest of the country. According to Shapiro and Kenty-Drane, historical and social obstacles (slavery and racial segregation) have prevented African Americans from securing and accumulating assets Including quality housing). Yinger also suggests that racial discrimination still plays a role in housing; black and Latino households must pay higher search costs, accept lower-quality housing and live in lower-quality neighborhoods due to discrimination. One study found that 20 percent of potential moves made by African American households and 17 percent of potential moves made by Latino households were discouraged by discrimination in the search process.

Effects
The most direct effect of housing inequality is an inequality of neighborhood amenities, which include the condition of surrounding houses, the availability of social networks, the amount of air pollution, the crime rate, and the quality of local schools.  A neighborhood with a certain quality of amenities typically includes individual residences of corresponding quality. Those with lower incomes usually live in areas with poor amenities to win the spatial competition for housing. A neighborhood amenity includes satisfaction derived from living in a nice area, and many studies suggest that growing up in a high-poverty neighborhood affects social and economic outcomes later in life.

Another way the poor compete for housing is by renting homes rather than buying them, which furthers the negative effects of housing inequality by restricting access to household wealth.

Proposed remedies
Proposals to remedy the adverse effects of housing inequality include:
 Subsidized housing, also known as affordable housing. Subsidized housing includes:
 Co-operative housing
 Non-profit housing
 Direct housing
 Public housing
 Rent supplements
 Private-sector housing - U.S. landlords who provide adequate housing 
 Fair-lending enforcement  - Lenders are expected to not discriminate against borrowers because of family status, race, originality, gender, and color
 Scattered-site housing - A housing system where rent is based on household income This system is popular in Philadelphia in the  U.S.
 Investment in local school systems - According to Ruel Hamilton, financially supporting schools in impoverished areas has a ripple effect which improves school ratings and property values for owners of inner-city housing projects.
 Land value tax - A progressive tax on land ownership

Inequality
Although the focus of housing inequality has changed with time, contemporary international analyses tend to center on urbanization and the move to metropolitan areas. International housing inequality is largely characterized by urban disparities. A 2007 UN-HABITAT report estimated that over one billion people worldwide lived in slums at the time, a figure expected to double by 2030.
  
In developing countries, housing inequality is increasingly caused by rural-to-urban migration, increasing urban poverty and inequality, insecure tenure and globalization. All these factors contribute to the creation and continuation of slums in poorer areas of the world. One proposed solution is slum upgrading.

See also
 Effects of economic inequality
 Homelessness
 Housing discrimination in the United States 
 Real estate bubble
 Urbanization

Notes

References
 
 
 Shapiro, Thomas M. and Kenty-Drane, Jessica L. (2005). "The Racial Wealth Gap," in Cecilia A Conrad, John Whitehead, Patrick Mason, and James Stewart (eds.) African Americans in the U.S. Economy, pp. 175–181, Lanham: Rowman and Littlefield Publishers, Inc.
 Sen, Amartya K. (2000). "Development as Freedom." New York: Anchor, 2000. 1–53. Print.
 Sen, Amartya K. (2004). "From Income Inequality to Economic Inequality," in C. Michael Henry (ed.) Race, Poverty, and Domestic Policy, pp. 59–82, New Haven and London: Yale University Press
 Lüthi, C. (2016). Slum Improvement Lessons in Africa: Kibera. In Learning from the Slums for the Development of Emerging Cities (pp. 115–124). Springer International Publishing.
 Sen, Amartya K. (2009). "The Idea of Justice," pp. 1–27, Cambridge: Belknap Press of Harvard University Press.
 
 
 Beeghley, L. (2015). Structure of social stratification in the United States. Routledge.
 Massey, D. S., Albright, L., Casciano, R., Derickson, E., & Kinsey, D. N. (2013). Climbing Mount Laurel: The struggle for affordable housing and social mobility in an American suburb. Princeton University Press.
 
 
 Osberg, L. (2015). Economic inequality in the United States. Routledge.
 
 UN-HABITAT "Sustainable Urbanization." Unhabitat.org, 16 Apr. 2007. Web. 24 Nov. 2010.
 
 
 Yinger, John. 2001. "Housing Discrimination and Residential Segregation as Causes of Poverty," in Sheldon H. Danzinger and Robert H. Haveman (eds.) Understanding Poverty, pp. 359–391, New York: Russell Sage Foundation.
 A tale of two housing markets: mansions for the rich while poor are priced out (2015-01-20), The Guardian

Affordable housing
Economic inequality
Social inequality